Terekla (Tiräkle) is a rural locality (a village) in Zirgansky Selsoviet, Meleuzovsky District, Bashkortostan, Russia. The population was 67 as of 2010. There are 6 streets.

Geography 
Terekla is located 29 km north of Meleuz (the district's administrative centre) by road. Staraya Kazanovka and Troitskoye are the nearest rural localities.

References 

Rural localities in Meleuzovsky District